Crossbow is a light gun shooter video game released in arcades by Exidy in 1983. It was later published by Absolute Entertainment for the Commodore 64 and MS-DOS, and by Atari Corporation for the Atari 2600, Atari 7800, and Atari 8-bit family starting in 1987. The game is controlled via a positional gun that resembles a full-sized crossbow.

Exidy promoted Crossbow to arcade operators as being convertible to new themes released in the future. Five themed conversion kits were created, each commencing with the letter 'c': Cheyenne, Combat, Crackshot, Clay Pigeon, and the controversial Chiller. Several more games were also released for the system: Hit 'n Miss, Showdown, Top Secret, and Who Dunnit.

Gameplay

The player protects a band of adventurers from afar by shooting objects that threaten them. The adventurers enter from the left-hand side of the screen and attempt to cross the screen unharmed. If the player helps them reach the opposite side of the screen safely, the adventurers survive to the next scenario, and new adventurers are occasionally granted between scenarios.

In addition to the obstacles, the adventurers are vulnerable to the player's shots. The first time the player shoots an adventurer, he/she will be unharmed with an onscreen warning message displaying. Thereafter, shooting an adventurer will cause him/her to emit a cry of pain, and to walk at a slower pace the rest of the way across. A second shot will kill the adventurer.

Scenarios are chosen by shooting a destination on a map screen, which include: town, desert, volcano, cave, bridge, jungle, and castle. The goal is to reach the final scenario, past the castle, in which the player confronts the Master of Darkness, who presumably created the dangers in the game. Defeating the Master of Darkness requires shooting him in the eyes when they turn red (and deadly). The player is treated to a brief congratulation and a challenge to defeat the Master of Darkness again, "IF YOU DARE". Following this screen the player starts over with however many adventurers survived the confrontation.

Another aspect of the arcade version of the game was that when one inserted a quarter into the game, the game would play a sound file that said "You will die!"

Reception
Gene Lewin of Play Meter magazine reviewed the dedicated arcade cabinet in 1983, scoring it 4 out of 10 for being "a good game but overpriced". In 1995, Flux magazine ranked Crossbow 98th on their Top 100 Video Games.  They praised the game calling it "A true harbinger of future arcade hits."

References

External links
Crossbow for the Atari 8-bit family at Atari Mania
Crossbow for the Atari 2600 at Atari Mania

1983 video games
Arcade video games
Atari 2600 games
Atari 7800 games
Atari 8-bit family games
Commodore 64 games
DOS games
Exidy games
Light gun games
Video games developed in the United States
Video games set in castles
Multiplayer and single-player video games
Absolute Entertainment games